Price is a city in the U.S. state of Utah and the county seat of Carbon County. The city is home to Utah State University Eastern, as well as the USU Eastern Prehistoric Museum. Price is located within short distances of both Nine Mile Canyon and the Manti-La Sal National Forest.

The population was 8,715 at the 2010 census, making it the largest city in Carbon County.

Geography
Price is located in west-central Carbon County at the northwestern edge of the Colorado Plateau. The Price River, a tributary of the Green River, flows southeasterly through the city, and the San Rafael Swell is to the south.

The city is on U.S. Route 6 and U.S. Route 191. The two highways together run southeast  to the city of Green River and Interstate 70. Utah State Route 10 leads southwest from Price  to Huntington.

Price was one of the communities that was served by the Rio Grande Zephyr passenger train. Today Amtrak's California Zephyr passes once a day each direction with a station about seven miles away in Helper.

Climate
Price is located in an arid climate and features cold winters and relatively moderate summers. The low in January averages just , and even in summer the dry climate keeps the nights cool, with an average of just . Price lies in the rain shadow of central Utah's Wasatch Mountains so that precipitation averages only  annually. Late summer and early fall are the wettest times of year due to the Gulf of California monsoon that brings scattered thunderstorms to the region. The city also sees frequent snow during winter and early spring.

This climatic region is typified by large seasonal temperature differences, with warm to hot (and often humid) summers and cold (sometimes severely cold) winters.  According to the Köppen Climate Classification system, Price has a cool semi-arid climate, abbreviated BSk on climate maps.

Demographics

As of the census of 2000, there were 8,402 people, 3,045 households, and 2,085 families residing in the city. The population density was 1,979.7 people per square mile (765.1/km2). There were 3,311 housing units at an average density of 780.2 per square mile (301.5/km2). The racial makeup of the city was 90.70% White, 0.26% African American, 1.37% Native American, 0.56% Asian, 0.04% Pacific Islander, 4.25% from other races, and 2.82% from two or more races. Hispanic or Latino of any race were 10.08% of the population.

There were 3,045 households, out of which 34.4% had children under the age of 18 living with them, 53.2% were married couples living together, 11.5% had a female householder with no husband present, and 31.5% were non-families. 27.4% of all households were made up of individuals, and 12.2% had someone living alone who was 65 years of age or older. The average household size was 2.60 and the average family size was 3.19.

In the city, the population was spread out, with 27.6% under the age of 18, 15.9% from 18 to 24, 22.5% from 25 to 44, 19.9% from 45 to 64, and 14.1% who were 65 years of age or older. The median age was 32 years. For every 100 females, there were 91.7 males. For every 100 females age 18 and over, there were 88.3 males.

The median income for a household in the city was $31,687, and the median income for a family was $39,429. Males had a median income of $37,476 versus $21,081 for females. The per capita income for the city was $14,313. About 11.4% of families and 15.0% of the population were below the poverty line, including 16.3% of those under age 18 and 11.1% of those age 65 or over.

2015
As of 2015 the largest self-reported ancestry groups in Price, Utah are:

Education

There are two public elementary schools in Price (Creekview and Castle Heights); one middle school (Mont Harmon); one high school (Carbon); and one alternative high school (Lighthouse). It is also the location of the charter Pinnacle Canyon Academy, which serves grades K-12, as well as the Castle Valley Center for disabled children. Some children located in the Gordon Creek area attend Sally Mauro Elementary in Helper.

Price is the location of Utah State University Eastern, which has an enrollment of approximately 2,700.

Notable people
 Harold Arceneaux, professional basketball player who gained national attention during his collegiate career at Weber State University; played two seasons at the College of Eastern Utah in Price
 Dean and Lynn Fausett, painters of the American West
 John D. Fitzgerald, author known for his The Great Brain series of books for children
 Herman Franks, former catcher, coach, manager, general manager and scout in Major League Baseball
 Dave Lauriski, head of the Mine Safety and Health Administration from 2001 to 2004
 J. Bracken Lee, mayor of Price from 1935 to 1947, governor of Utah from 1949 to 1957, mayor of Salt Lake City from 1960 to 1971
 Cassandra Lynn, model, Playboy Playmate, born in Price
 Erik Pears, NFL offensive lineman
 Jean Westwood, first female chair of the Democratic National Committee; worked on several presidential campaigns
 Scott Woodward, molecular geneticist noted for his work with the discovery of the first genetic marker for cystic fibrosis, as well as with ancient mummy, mammoth, and dinosaur DNA

See also

 List of cities and towns in Utah
 Cleveland-Lloyd Dinosaur Quarry
 Helper, Utah
 KCBU
 National Register of Historic Places listings in Carbon County, Utah

References

External links

 Price City official website
 USU Eastern Prehistoric Museum

Cities in Carbon County, Utah
Cities in Utah
County seats in Utah
Populated places established in 1879
Micropolitan areas of Utah